A politburo or political bureau is the executive committee for communist parties. It is present in most former and existing communist states.

Names
The term "politburo" in English comes from the Russian Politbyuro, itself a contraction of Politicheskoye byuro ("Political Bureau"). The Spanish term Politburó is directly loaned from Russian, as is the German Politbüro. Chinese uses a calque, from which the Vietnamese, and Korean ( Jeongchiguk) terms derive.

History

The first politburo was created in Russia by the Bolshevik Party in 1917 during the Russian Revolution that occurred during that year. The first Politburo had seven members: Vladimir Lenin,  Grigory Zinoviev, Lev Kamenev, Leon Trotsky, Joseph Stalin, Grigori Sokolnikov, and Andrei Bubnov.

During the 20th century, politburos were established in most Communist states. They included the politburos of the USSR, East Germany, Afghanistan, and Czechoslovakia. Several countries still have a politburo system in operation: China, North Korea, Laos, Vietnam, and Cuba.

Marxist–Leninist states

In Marxist–Leninist states, the communist party claims to be the vanguard of the people, therefore the legitimate body to lead the state. The party selects officials to serve in its politburo, which decides party policy. As a one-party state, party policy invariably becomes national policy.

Each Party Congress elects a Central Committee which, in turn, elects the members of the politburo, secretariat, and a General Secretary. This process is termed democratic centralism. In theory, the politburo is answerable to the Central Committee, however in practice all the authority lies with the politburo.

Trotskyist parties
In Trotskyist parties, the Politburo is a bureau of the Central Committee tasked with making day-to-day political decisions, which must later be ratified by the Central Committee. It is appointed by the Central Committee from among its members. The post of General Secretary carries far less weight in this model. See, for example, the Lanka Sama Samaja Party.

See also

 Eastern Bloc politics
 Executive committee
 Orgburo
 Politburo of the Communist Party of the Soviet Union
 Politburo of the Chinese Communist Party
 Politburo of the Communist Party of Cuba
 Politburo of the Communist Party of Vietnam
 Politburo of the Communist Party of India (Marxist)
 Politburo of the Lao People's Revolutionary Party
 Politburo of the Party of Labour of Albania
 Politburo of the People's Democratic Party of Afghanistan
 Politburo of the Polish United Workers' Party
 Politburo of the Workers' Party of Korea
 Political Bureau of the Central Committee of FRELIMO
 Politburo of the Zimbabwe African National Union – Patriotic Front
 Presidium

References

External links 

 
Communist organizations
Political parties
Political terminology